Miloš Raičković may refer to:

Sports

Football
Miloš Raičković (footballer) (born 1993), Montengerin footballer

Music
Miloš Raičković (composer) (born 1956), Serbian-American composer